Agrioglypta proximalis is a moth in the family Crambidae. It is found on the Solomon Islands, where it was recorded on Rennell Island.

References

Moths described in 1962
Spilomelinae
Moths of Oceania